Cypholoba is a genus of beetles in the family Carabidae, containing the following species:

 Cypholoba alstoni Peringuey, 1892
 Cypholoba alveolata (Breme, 1844)
 Cypholoba amatonga (Peringuey, 1892)
 Cypholoba apicata (Fairmaire, 1885)
 Cypholoba bihamata (Gerstaecker, 1866)
 Cypholoba biloba (Fairmaire, 1882)
 Cypholoba bottegoi G. Muller, 1938
 Cypholoba bouvieri (Sternberg, 1907)
 Cypholoba brevivittis (Chaudoir, 1866)
 Cypholoba caillaudi (Laporte de Castelnau, 1835)
 Cypholoba cardiodera (Fairmaire, 1887)
 Cypholoba chanleri (Linell, 1896)
 Cypholoba chaudoiri (Peringuey, 1892)
 Cypholoba cinereocincta (Fairmaire, 1885)
 Cypholoba dartevellei Basilewsky, 1967
 Cypholoba divisa (Boheman, 1860)
 Cypholoba edax (Peringuey, 1892)
 Cypholoba elegantula (Fairmaire, 1887)
 Cypholoba fritschi Chaudoir, 1883
 Cypholoba gracilis Dejean, 1831
 Cypholoba graphipteroides (Guerin-Meneville, 1845)
 Cypholoba grimaudi (Benard, 1922)
 Cypholoba griseostriata (Fairmaire, 1884)
 Cypholoba grisescens (Fairmaire, 1884)
 Cypholoba hamifera (Harold, 1880)
 Cypholoba harrarensis (Sternberg, 1908)
 Cypholoba intermedia (Boheman, 1848)
 Cypholoba interrupta (Fairmaire, 1887)
 Cypholoba intricata (C. A. Dohrn, 1882)
 Cypholoba kassaica (Benard, 1927)
 Cypholoba kavanaughi Basilewsky, 1983
 Cypholoba leucospilota (Bertoloni, 1849)
 Cypholoba lundana Basilewsky, 1983
 Cypholoba macilenta (Olivier, 1795)
 Cypholoba mouffletii (Chaudoir, 1866)
 Cypholoba notata (Perroud, 1846)
 Cypholoba oberthueri (Sternberg, 1907)
 Cypholoba obtusata (Fairmaire, 1887)
 Cypholoba opulenta (Boheman, 1860)
 Cypholoba overlaeti Burgeon, 1935
 Cypholoba perspicillaris (Chaudoir, 1878)
 Cypholoba piaggiae (Gestro, 1881)
 Cypholoba posticalis (Fairmaire, 1885)
 Cypholoba prolixa (Fairmaire, 1891)
 Cypholoba rohani (Benard, 1921)
 Cypholoba rutata (Peringuey, 1892)
 Cypholoba sambesina (Peringuey, 1908)
 Cypholoba schenklingi (Sternberg, 1907)
 Cypholoba semibrunnea Strohmeyer, 1928
 Cypholoba semisuturata (Chaudoir, 1866)
 Cypholoba somereni (Benard, 1930)
 Cypholoba spathulata (Gerstaecker, 1866)
 Cypholoba suturella (Chaudoir, 1866)
 Cypholoba tenuicollis (Chaudoir, 1878)
 Cypholoba tetrastigma (Chaudoir, 1848)
 Cypholoba trilineata Strohmeyer, 1928
 Cypholoba trilunata (Gerstaecker, 1884)
 Cypholoba zambeziana (Benard, 1922)

References 

Anthiinae (beetle)
Carabidae genera